The Academy of Arts (Akādīmīya al-Finūn) is a large educational complex in Cairo, Egypt, established by the Ministry of Culture of the then-United Arab Republic in 1959.

It began with three institutes (for film, music, and ballet), but today comprises several institutions of higher learning:

Cairo Conservatoire ("المعهد العالي للموسيقى "الكونســرفاتوار), established in 1959
Higher Institute of Artistic Criticism (المعهد العالي للنقد الفني)
Higher Institute of Arabic Music (المعهد العالي للموسيقى العربية), established in 1929; comprises two performing groups: the Umm Kulthum Band for Arab Music and the Religious Recitation Band
Cairo Higher Institute of Cinema (المعهد العالي للسينما), established in 1959
Higher Institute of Dramatic Arts (المعهد العالي للفنون المسرحية), established in 1944 and comprising programs in acting, dramatic arts, décor, criticism, make-up, and integrated artist
Higher Institute of Ballet (المعهد العالي للباليه), established in 1959
High Institute of Folk Arts (المعهد العالي للفنون الشعبية), established in 1981

Additional performing groups include:

Academic Troupes for Folk Music 
Academy of Arts Symphonic Orchestra 
Children & Youth Chorale
Academic Troupe for Ballet 
Academic Troupe for Theatre

The Academy of Arts's former president right now is Ashraf Zaki.
The Academy of Arts's former president was Ahlam Younes.

References

External links
Official Academy of Arts website
egy-mhe.gov: Academy of Arts page - (Arabic)
Saudiaramcoworld: "Choreography in Cairo—classical ballet comes to Egypt"
Egypt State Information Service: Academy of Arts page

Education in Cairo
Art schools in Egypt
Music schools in Egypt
Culture in Cairo
Egyptian culture
Educational institutions established in 1959
1959 establishments in Egypt